Mirpur Khas junction railway station  is junction located in middle of the Mirpur Khas, Sindh, Pakistan on Hyderabad - Khokhrapar branch railway line. The station is staffed and has booking office.

History 
Before 1965, the Hyderabad-Khokhrapar Branch Line was metre gauge and Mirpur Khas railway station was the junction of Mirpur Khas - Nawabshah railway line. In 1965 Hyderabad - Mirpur Khas railway section converted to broad gauge and the rail link between the Pakistan and India via Khokhrapar and Munabao closed. In 2006 the train service between Mirpur Khas and Nawabshah closed. In February 2006 Mirpur Khas - Khokhrapar metre gauge railway line converted to broad gauge and railway link between Pakistan and India via Khokhrapar and Munabao restored again.

Train routes
The routes of Hyderabad Mirpur Khas brach line is linked from Karachi as follow : Karachi, Landhi, Dhabeji, Jang Shahi, Jhampir, Kotri,Hyderabad, Tando Jam, Tando Allahyar, Mirpur Khas, Dhoro Naro, Pithoro, Chorr, Khokhrapar.

Train services from Mirpur Khas

See also 
 Pakistan Railways
 List of railway stations in Pakistan
 Rawalpindi Railway Station
 Lahore Railway Station
 Quetta Railway Station
 Peshawar Railway Station
 Larkana Railway Station

References

External links 

Railway stations in Mirpur Khas District
Railway stations on Hyderabad–Khokhrapar Branch Line
Railway stations on Mirpur Khas–Nawabshah Branch Line